Saeed Ahmed Hashmi is a Pakistani politician who has been a Member of the Senate of Pakistan, since March 2021.

Political career 
Hashmi was first elected as senator in 2003 and reelected as a candidate of Pakistan Muslim League (Q) on seats for Technocrats/Ulema in 2006 Pakistani Senate elections and served till March 2012.

In 2018, Hashmi along with some dissident Balochistan based leaders from PML-N and PML-Q founded Balochistan Awami Party.

He was re-elected as senator as a candidate of Balochistan Awami Party on seats for Technocrats/Ulema in 2021 Pakistani Senate elections.

He also thrice elected as MPA of Balochistan Assembly from his constituency PB-3 (Quetta-III) from 1988 to 1990, 1993-1996 and 1997-1999 and also served as provincial minister.

References 

Living people
Balochistan MPAs 1988–1990
Balochistan MPAs 1993–1996
Balochistan MPAs 1997–1999
Year of birth missing (living people)